Clanculus euchelioides, common name the small top shell, is a species of sea snail, a marine gastropod mollusk in the family Trochidae, the top snails.

Description
(Original description by R. Tate) The size of the shell varies between 6 mm and 9 mm.
The somewhat solid shell has a turbinately conchoid shape. It is opaque, concolorous (reddish). It contains about six whorls. The ordinary spire whorls are separated by a canaliculate suture and are flattened posteriorly.  The body whorl is convex in the anterior-third. The base of the shell is flatly convex and falsely umbilicated.  The columella enters the umbilical depression, which is shallow and moderately narrow. The aperture is oblique and rhomboidoval. The outer lip is slightly depressed at the suture. The outer and basal margins are thin,  lirate, and iridescent within (the lirae not extending to the margin). The oblique columella is straight, rib-like, with an attenuated keel elevated into a tooth-like prominence at the base, and separated from the basal margin of the aperture by a deep gemmulated ribs of about equal magnitude. At the suture there is a double smaller rib, and there is a finer one posterior to the periphery. The transverse riblets of the penultimate whorl show increasing revolution of the whorls and become more slender and
closer together. And thus the fenestrated ornament is somewhat obscured on the front part of the body whorl. Below the periphery there are about five revolving equal-sized ribs, more or less gemmulated at the intersections of transverse sigmoidal threads, the one margining the umbilicus most conspicuously so. The umbilical wall has about five flat threads crossed by lamella-like striae.

The conspicuous oblique ribbing and very wide umbilicus are characters which separate this species from the majority of its congeners.

Distribution
This marine species is endemic to Australia and occurs off Queensland, South Australia and Western Australia.

References

Tate, R. 1893. Some additions to the list of the Marine Gastropoda of South Australia. Transactions of the Royal Society of South Australia 17(1): 189-202
 Tomlin, J.R. le B. 1924. Description of a new species of Clanculus (Clanculus gatliffi). Proceedings of the Malacological Society of London 16(1): 24
 Iredale, T. 1929. Queensland molluscan notes, No. 1. Memoirs of the Queensland Museum 9(3): 261-297, pls 30-31 [29 June 1929
 Cotton, B.C. & Godfrey, F.K. 1934. South Australian Shells. Part 11. South Australian Naturalist 15(3): 77-92
 Cotton, B.C. 1945. Southern Australian Gastropoda. Part 1. Streptoneura. Transactions of the Royal Society of South Australia 69(1): 150-171
 Cotton, B.C. 1959. South Australian Mollusca. Archaeogastropoda. Handbook of the Flora and Fauna of South Australia. Adelaide : South Australian Government Printer 449 pp.
 Wilson, B. 1993. Australian Marine Shells. Prosobranch Gastropods. Kallaroo, Western Australia : Odyssey Publishing Vol. 1 408 pp.
 Jansen, P. 1995. A review of the genus Clanculus Montfort, 1810 (Gastropoda: Trochidae) in Australia, with description of a new subspecies and the introduction of a nomen novum. Vita Marina 43(1-2): 39-62

External links
 To Biodiversity Heritage Library (1 publication)
 To World Register of Marine Species

euchelioides
Gastropods of Australia
Gastropods described in 1893